nhttpd is an open-source web server, also known as the Nostromo web server, designed by Marcus Glocker. It runs as a single process, and handles normal concurrent connections by select calls, but for efficiency during more demanding connections such as directory listings and CGI execution it forks. It supports HTTP/1.1 and CGI/1.1, Basic access authentication, SSL, IPv6, custom responses, aliases and virtual hosts. Security measures include running setuid and chrooting. Public access is controlled using the world readable flags and CGI execution by the world executable flags of the file system permissions.

See also 

 Comparison of web servers

External links 
 nhttpd web site
 Debian nostromo packaging

Free web server software
Software using the ISC license